Sanguinolaria tellinoides is a species of saltwater clam, marine bivalve molluscs of the family Psammobiidae.

Description
Sanguinolaria tellinoides can reach a size of 30–70 mm. It is a facultatively mobile infaunal deposit feeder.

Distribution
This species is present along the Pacific coast of United States, Mexico and Central America (Costa Rica, Nicaragua, Honduras, Ecuador).

References
 Huber M. (2010) Compendium of bivalves. A full-color guide to 3,300 of the world’s marine bivalves. A status on Bivalvia after 250 years of research. Hackenheim: ConchBooks. 901 pp., 1
 Coan E.V. & Valentich-Scott P. (2012) Bivalve seashells of tropical West America. Marine bivalve mollusks from Baja California to northern Peru. 2 vols, 1258 pp. Santa Barbara: Santa Barbara Museum of Natural History

External links
 WoRMS
 Encyclopedia of life
 Gwannon
 Paleobiology Database

 
Bivalves described in 1850